Gangseo District (literally west of river district) is a gu on the west side of Nakdong River in Busan, South Korea. It has an area of 179.05 km², and a population of about 66,000; it has a lower population density than Gijang county of Busan. Gangseo-gu was part of Buk-gu from its creation in 1978 to 1989 when it became an independent gu.

Gangseo-gu is the westernmost gu in Busan and it shares a common borders with Gimhae on its north-west side and Jinhae-gu, Changwon on its south-west side.

Gangseo-gu is the birthplace of the Gaya civilization.

Gimhae International Airport, Heungguk Temple, Myeongwol Temple, as well as the Eulsukdo bird sanctuary are located in Gangseo-gu.

Administrative divisions

Gangseo-gu is divided into 22 legal dong. They have been grouped together to form only 7 administrative dong, as follows:

Daejeo 1-dong
Daejeo 2-dong
Gangdong-dong
Myeongji 1-dong
Myeongji 2-dong
Garak-dong (4 legal dong)
Jukrim-dong, Sikman-dong, Jukdong-dong, Bongnim-dong
Noksan-dong (9 legal dong)
Songjeong-dong, Hwajeon-dong, Noksan-dong, Saenggok-dong, Gurang-dong, Jisa-dong, Mieum-dong, Beombang-dong, Sinho-dong
Gadeokdo-dong (5 legal dong)
Dongseon-dong, Seongbuk-dong, Nulcha-dong, Cheonseong-dong, Daehang-dong

See also
Geography of South Korea

References

External links

Gangseo-gu website 

 
Districts of Busan